Concordia University Ann Arbor (CUAA) is the Ann Arbor, Michigan campus of Concordia University Wisconsin, a private Lutheran university in Mequon, Wisconsin. As part of Concordia University, it is accredited by the Higher Learning Commission.

Concordia University Ann Arbor's  campus sits on the banks of the Huron River, about ten minutes outside downtown Ann Arbor, Michigan. Concordia is affiliated with the Lutheran Church–Missouri Synod (LCMS) and is a college of the Concordia University System. CUAA merged with Concordia University Wisconsin in 2013.

History

In the early 1960s, the LCMS purchased the Earhart Manor and surrounding estate in Ann Arbor and began construction of Concordia Lutheran Junior College. The campus was designed by architect Vincent Kling in a mid-century modern style. Classes began in the fall of 1964 with 234 students and 24 instructors. The school began offering four-year degree programs in 1976 and changed its name to Concordia College. It assumed its current name in 2001.

In 1977, Concordia began performing the "Boars Head Festival", an annual Christmas celebration filled with song, music, and drama that is much beloved by current students, alumni, and community members.

In the 2000s, the university experienced "a number of financial, enrollment and administrative difficulties" that prompted it to enter into discussions with Concordia University Wisconsin about a possible merger. The merger became effective on July 1, 2013, with Curt Gielow, former executive dean of CUW's School of Pharmacy and former mayor of Mequon, Wisconsin, becoming Vice President of Administration and Chief Campus Officer at CUAA. He was replaced at the end of 2018 by Ryan Peterson.

In 2015, the university purchased the former Ann Arbor campus of the Thomas M. Cooley Law School.

Athletics
The Concordia–Ann Arbor (CUAA) athletic teams are called the Cardinals. The school's mascot is named Corky the Cardinal. The university is a member of the National Association of Intercollegiate Athletics (NAIA), primarily competing in the Wolverine–Hoosier Athletic Conference (WHAC) for most of its sports since the 1992–93 academic year; while its football team competes in the Mideast League of the Mid-States Football Association (MSFA). They are also a member of the National Christian College Athletic Association (NCCAA), primarily competing as an independent in the Midwest Region of the Division I level.

CUAA competes in 28 intercollegiate varsity sports: Men's sports include baseball, basketball, bowling, cross country, football, golf, ice hockey, lacrosse, soccer, tennis and track & field (indoor and outdoor). Women's sports include basketball, bowling, cross country, golf, ice hockey, lacrosse, soccer, softball, stunt, tennis, track & field (indoor and outdoor) and volleyball; and co-ed sports include cheerleading, competitive dance and eSports.

Mascot
The school's mascot is named Corky the Cardinal.

Accomplishments
National Championships:

 1998 - Softball - NCCAA
 1999 - Softball - NCCAA
 2019 - Cheerleading - NAIA
 2019 - Baseball - NCCAA
 2022 - Baseball - NCCAA

References

External links

 
 Official athletics website

 
Liberal arts colleges in Michigan
Universities and colleges affiliated with the Lutheran Church–Missouri Synod
Educational institutions established in 1963
Education in Ann Arbor, Michigan
Universities and colleges in Washtenaw County, Michigan
Tourist attractions in Ann Arbor, Michigan
1963 establishments in Michigan
Private universities and colleges in Michigan